Thomas R. Zentall is a professor of psychology at the University of Kentucky.  His research focusses on learning and memory in non-human animals. A former president of both the Midwestern Psychological Association and the Eastern Psychological Association, Zentall has over 300 publications in peer reviewed journals.
In 2014 Zentall was honoured by the Comparative Cognition Society for his contributions to the study of animal cognition.

He is a fellow of the Society of Experimental Psychologists.

References

External links

20th-century births
Living people
21st-century American psychologists
Animal cognition writers
University of Kentucky faculty
Comparative psychologists
Fellows of the Society of Experimental Psychologists
Year of birth missing (living people)
Place of birth missing (living people)